The Subject is a Canadian animated short film, directed by Patrick Bouchard and released in 2018. An exploration of the creative process, the film features Bouchard performing a dissection on a model of his own body.

The film premiered at the 2018 Cannes Film Festival, in the Director's Fortnight stream. It was the only Canadian film screened at Cannes in 2018.

The film was named to the Toronto International Film Festival's annual year-end Canada's Top Ten list for 2018. It received a Canadian Screen Award nomination for Best Animated Short Film at the 7th Canadian Screen Awards in 2019, and won the Prix Iris for Best Animated Short Film at the 21st Quebec Cinema Awards.

References

External links
 

2018 films
2010s animated short films
Films directed by Patrick Bouchard
Canadian animated short films
National Film Board of Canada animated short films
French-language Canadian films
2010s Canadian films
Best Animated Short Film Jutra and Iris Award winners